Héctor Horacio Leonel Scotta Guigo (born 27 September 1950) is a retired Argentine football striker. He was born in the city of San Justo in the Santa Fe Province of Argentina. Scotta is most famous for his feat of scoring 60 goals in 1975.

Career
Scotta started his career in 1970 with Unión de Santa Fe but after only one season he moved to Club Atlético San Lorenzo de Almagro where he was part of the Nacional winning team of 1974. In 1975 Scotta was the topscorer of the Nacional championship with 28 goals and Metropolitano champion with 32 goals, this made him the topscorer in South America and in world football for 1975. Scotta was awarded the Olimpia de Plata as the Argentine sports writer's footballer of the year. During 1975, Scotta broke Arsenio Erico's single-season Argentine Primera División goal-scoring record with 48 goals.

Scotta's goalscoring achievements of 1975 attracted the attention of a number of foreign clubs, the team that managed to sign him was Grêmio in Brazil, where he helped them to win the Campeonato Gaúcho in 1977.

In 1979 Scotta returned to San Lorenzo, he then had a season with Ferro Carril Oeste in 1980, another with San Lorenzo in 1981 and a final season at the top level of Argentine football with Boca Juniors.
He also played for Sevilla FC.

Scotta later had spells with 2nd division outfits  Nueva Chicago, All Boys and Deportivo Armenio.

Personal life
Scotta's grandson Valentino Fattore is also a professional footballer who currently plays for Sevilla.

Honours

Club
 San Lorenzo
Primera Division Argentina Champions: Nacional 1974

 Grêmio
Campeonato Gaúcho Champions: 1977

Individual
Primera Division Argentina Top scorer: Metropolitano 1975 (32 goals)
Seasonwise World Top Scorer: 1975
Top scorer in South America: 1975 (60 Goals)
Olimpia de Plata: 1975
Primera Division Argentina Top scorer: Nacional 1975 (28 goals)

References

External links

  
 Interview with Scotta in Clarín 
 San Lorenzo Idols 
 San Lorenzo profile 
 

1950 births
Living people
People from San Justo Department, Santa Fe
Argentine footballers
Argentina international footballers
Association football forwards
Unión de Santa Fe footballers
San Lorenzo de Almagro footballers
Expatriate footballers in Brazil
Grêmio Foot-Ball Porto Alegrense players
Ferro Carril Oeste footballers
Boca Juniors footballers
Nueva Chicago footballers
All Boys footballers
Argentine Primera División players
Argentine expatriate footballers
Pan American Games medalists in football
Pan American Games gold medalists for Argentina
Footballers at the 1971 Pan American Games
Medalists at the 1971 Pan American Games
Sportspeople from Santa Fe Province